Samuel Kwame Owusu (born 28 March 1996) is a Ghanaian professional footballer who plays as a winger for Serbian club Čukarički and Ghana national team.

Club career

Radnik Surdulica
Born in Accra, Owusu played for Red Bull Ghana and Vision in his homeland, before moving abroad to Serbia and joining Radnik Surdulica in August 2014. He made 12 appearances in the 2014–15 Serbian First League, helping the club win the title and promotion to the top flight. In the 2015–16 Serbian SuperLiga, Owusu started playing more regularly, scoring seven times in 30 games. He signed a one-year extension with the club in May 2016.

Gençlerbirliği
In June 2016, Owusu was transferred to Turkish club Gençlerbirliği on a two-year deal with an option for another year. The transfer fee was reportedly €200,000. He made three appearances in the 2016–17 Turkish Cup, scoring one goal in a 6–0 home victory over Amed, but failed to appear in any league games during the season.

Čukarički
In August 2017, Owusu returned to Serbia and joined Čukarički, penning a three-year contract and receiving the number 19 shirt. He scored four times in 30 games during the 2017–18 Serbian SuperLiga. In the following 2018–19 season, Owusu scored seven goals and helped the club earn a spot in UEFA competitions after three years.

Al-Fayha
On 18 August 2019, Al-Fayha has signed Owusu for one seasons from Čukarički.

Al-Ahli
On 25 October 2020, Al-Ahli have signed Owusu on loan for three months from Al-Fayha.

International career
In late May 2019, Owusu was named in Ghana's 29-man provisional squad for the 2019 Africa Cup of Nations. He subsequently debuted for the Black Stars in early June, coming on as a substitute in a 1–0 friendly loss to Namibia. Despite his team's defeat, Owusu made a strong impression, and got included in James Kwesi Appiah's final 23-man AFCON selection. He was part of the Ghanaian team for the 2021 African Cup of Nations in Cameroon.

Career statistics

Club

International

Scores and results list Ghana's goal tally first, score column indicates score after each Owusu goal.

Honours
Radnik Surdulica
 Serbian First League: 2014–15
Al-Fayha
 King Cup: 2021–22

References

External links
 
 
 

1996 births
Living people
2019 Africa Cup of Nations players
2021 Africa Cup of Nations players
Al-Ahli Saudi FC players
Al-Fayha FC players
Association football midfielders
Expatriate footballers in Saudi Arabia
Expatriate footballers in Serbia
Expatriate footballers in Turkey
FK Čukarički players
FK Radnik Surdulica players
Gençlerbirliği S.K. footballers
Ghana international footballers
Ghanaian expatriate footballers
Ghanaian expatriate sportspeople in Saudi Arabia
Ghanaian expatriate sportspeople in Serbia
Ghanaian expatriate sportspeople in Turkey
Ghanaian footballers
Saudi First Division League players
Saudi Professional League players
Serbian First League players
Serbian SuperLiga players
Footballers from Accra
Vision F.C. players